Pedro Joaquín Chamorro Cardenal (23 September 1924 – 10 January 1978) was a Nicaraguan journalist and publisher. He was the editor of La Prensa, the only significant opposition newspaper to the long rule of the Somoza family.  He is a 1977 laureate of the Maria Moors Cabot Prize of Columbia University in New York. He married Violeta Barrios de Chamorro, who later went on to become President of Nicaragua (1990-1997). In 1978, he was shot to death, one of the precipitating events of the overthrow of the Somoza regime the following year.

Background
Chamorro was a son of Pedro Joaquín Chamorro Zelaya and wife Margarita Cardenal Argüello and paternal grandson of Pedro Joaquín Chamorro Bolaños and wife Ana María Zelaya Bolaños. He was the maternal grandson of Salvador Cardenal Saborío (son of Pedro Cardenal Ayerdi and wife Ana Ma. Saborio Bonilla), and wife Isabel Argüello Prado (daughter of Pedro Argüello Argüello and wife Leocadia Parado y Méndez). Both were relatives of Leonardo Argüello, 66th President of Nicaragua. His great-grandparents were Pedro Joaquín Chamorro Alfaro, 39th President of Nicaragua, and wife María de la Luz Bolaños Bendaña.

He had two brothers, Jaime Chamorro Cardenal and Xavier Chamorro Cardenal, and two sisters, Ligia Chamorro Cardenal, married to Samuel Barreto Argüello (grand child of president Leonardo Arguello) and Ana María Chamorro Cardenal, married to Carlos Holmann Thompson (son of Edgard T. Holmann Reinecke and wife Carolina Thompson Gutierrez) from San Juan del Sur, parents of Eduardo, Verónica, Hugo Martín, Ana Carolina, Bruno, Ericka, and Juan Lorenzo Holmann Chamorro.

Murder and legacy
Chamorro wrote a letter in 1975 to Somoza: "I am waiting, with a clear conscience, and a soul at peace, for the blow you are to deliver." Three years later, in January 1978, Chamorro was killed by unknown gunmen who pulled up beside him in a car and opened fire with shotguns. Somoza claimed Chamorro was assassinated by Pedro Ramos, a Cuban-American entrepreneur whose business had been attacked by La Prensa. At the time, however, the Chamorro family and the  wealthy opposition held that Somoza had ordered him killed. Ramos took refuge in Miami, where he died. He was tried in absentia and found guilty of murder after the revolution, but he never returned to Nicaragua.

At his funeral, thousands of people followed the coffin from Managua's Oriental Hospital to the Chamorro family home, taking turns carrying it.

Following Chamorro's murder, an estimated 30,000 people rioted in the streets of Managua. Cars were set on fire and several buildings belonging to the Somoza family were attacked. A general strike was called. Outside the capital, unrest flared in a number of cities and towns, particularly in areas where National Guardsmen had massacred peasant farmers during the counterinsurgency effort. The government responded with further violence and reintroduced martial law censorship. During 1978, there were seven machine gun attacks and attempted bombings of La Prensa, now under the management of Chamorro's widow, Violeta Barrios de Chamorro. Following Somoza's overthrow, she was a part of the FSLN-based junta from 1979 to 1980. She later broke with the FSLN and was elected president of Nicaragua in 1990.

Speaking about her husband to the participants of the 1998 IPI World Congress in Moscow, Violeta said: "During his whole life, Pedro Joaquín Chamorro was a tireless fighter for democracy in Nicaragua and against the dictatorship of Somoza. This cost him incarceration, torture, exile and finally death. He was warned many times that plans existed to assassinate him, yet no threat detained him from fulfilling his mission to impart the truth and preach democracy."

They had four children: 
 Claudia Lucía Chamorro Barrios, married to Edmundo Jarquín, a relative of Carlos Alberto Brenes, 64th President of Nicaragua. Claudia was a Sandinista activist and ambassador to Cuba and Costa Rica in the 1980s. She and her family moved to the United States in 1991 to seek medical care when one of her sons was diagnosed with leukemia.
 Cristiana Chamorro Barrios, married to Antonio Lacayo, leading minister in President Chamorro Barrios' cabinet, and later a candidate for the Presidency. She became editor of La Prensa.
 Pedro Joaquín Chamorro Barrios, married to Martha Lucía Urcuyo. He was a journalist and later a politician that ran for mayor of Nicaragua's capital city of Managua. He was also a Contra leader who spent time in exile in Costa Rica, while his sister Claudia was ambassador on behalf of the FSLN government.
Carlos Fernando Chamorro, head of the official newspaper of the Sandinista Government, Barricada, and later a women's rights activist and independent investigative journalist. Chamorro was fired from Barricada by the FSLN in 1994 for refusing to bow to party censorship.

In 2000 he was named one of International Press Institute's 50 World Press Freedom Heroes of the past fifty years.

See also
 Chamorro (family)

References

1924 births
1978 deaths
Assassinated activists
Assassinated Nicaraguan journalists
Pedro Joaquin Chamorro Cardenal
Deaths by firearm in Nicaragua
Maria Moors Cabot Prize winners
1978 crimes in Nicaragua 
1978 murders in North America
1970s  murders in Nicaragua
Nicaraguan democracy activists
Nicaraguan editors
Nicaraguan publishers (people)
Nicaraguan short story writers
Male short story writers
Nicaraguan male writers
Nicaraguan torture victims
People from Granada, Nicaragua
People murdered in Nicaragua
People of the Nicaraguan Revolution
Male journalists
National Heroines and Heroes of Nicaragua
20th-century Nicaraguan writers
People educated at Colegio Centro América